The current flag of Jacksonville was adopted by the Jacksonville City Council on 24 February 1976. It was designed by Don Bozeman, winner of a design contest prior to the 1975 Bold CityFest, the annual celebration of the city/county government consolidation. The city's previous flag, designed by Edmund Jackson and adopted in 1914, was considered outdated.

The brown silhouette of a mounted Andrew Jackson is taken from a bronze statue in the downtown urban core, and represents the city's history and namesake. The sunburst represents a bright future. The map silhouette of the city/county with the St. Johns River through the middle shows the consolidated community and the large impact of the river. The color orange is significant in the "Sunshine State" and one of Jacksonville's neighborhoods is named Mandarin. 

A survey of flag design quality by the North American Vexillological Association ranked Jacksonville's flag the second best in Florida and 38th best of 150 American city flags.  It earned a score 5.03 out of 10 based on simple design, meaningful symbolism, use of 2–3 basic colors, including no writing or seals, and is distinctive.

The visually confusing silhouette under the horse is the tip of the scabbard of Andrew Jackson's sword.

See also
Flag of Florida

References

Government of Jacksonville, Florida
Jacksonville
Jacksonville
Jacksonville
1976 establishments in Florida
Andrew Jackson
Flags displaying animals